Machine Dazzle (born 1972) is an American costume designer, set designer, performance artist and drag queen known for his excessive and fantastical camp, surrealist, queer and maximalist approach.

Early life
Machine Dazzle was born Matthew Flower, in 1972 in Upper Darby, Pennsylvania. The middle child of three sons, Matthew was mostly raised by his mother Deborah, while his father James was away working as an engineer on oil tankers. The family moved to Houston, Texas and then eventually to Idaho Falls, where Matthew felt alienated amongst the predominantly Mormon community. “I was always the tallest and the gayest” Machine Dazzle told Hilton Als when speaking about this period of his life for a piece in The New Yorker.

Machine cites seeing the 1980 Olivia Newton-John film Xanadu at the age of 8 as a defining moment that helped shape his view of himself. At the age of 19, he came out as gay to his conservative parents.

Machine Dazzle attended and graduated from the University of Colorado, Boulder, earning a degree in art. In 1994 he moved to New York City and joined the Dazzle Dancers. Machine Dazzle spent this time working a myriad of day jobs, including a position as a jewelry designer and at the non-profit cultural center Exit Art, to support his growing fascination with designing extravagant costumes to wear at night in New York City's clubs such as CBGB and Jackie 60.

The origin of the name Machine Dazzle came from dancing in costume at one such club as a Dazzle Dancer. A friend referred to him as a dancing machine, which quickly morphed into Machine Dazzle. As Machine's costumes began to catch the attention of other club kids and eventually he began taking commissions from drag queens and dancers. Julie Atlas Muz asked Machine to design a full show in 2004. In 2008, Machine Dazzle designed the sets and costumes for Lustre, a Midwinter Trans-Fest, starring Justin Vivian Bond. In 2009, he designed Taylor Mac's five hour long The Lily’s Revenge. Mac and Machine Dazzle would go on to collaborate extensively throughout their careers.

Career
Machine is known for utilizing found objects into his costume work. Sourcing items like ping pong balls, slinkies, soup cans, rubber hotdogs and more, to deepen the work's narrative intent.

Machine was a co-recipient the 2017 Bessie Award for Outstanding Visual Design and the winner of a 2017 Henry Hewes Design Award.

In 2016, Taylor Mac's A 24-Decade History of Popular Music, which Machine Dazzle heavily collaborated on, was a finalist for the Pulitzer Prize in Drama.

In 2022, the Museum of Art and Design in New York opened first solo exhibition of Machine's work, ‘’Queer Maximalism x Machine Dazzle’’. The show occupied two full floors of the museum and positions full costumes, ephemera, material samples, photography, and video to fully contextualize the artists body of work.

Works

Plays 
Works costume and/or stage designed by Machine Dazzle:

References

1972 births
Living people
American costume designers
American drag queens
LGBT people from Pennsylvania